All Saints is a parish church in Maidstone, Kent. It is a Grade I listed building, and has been described as the grandest Perpendicular style church in Kent.

Establishment and dissolution
Founded by Archbishop of Canterbury William Courtenay in 1395 as part of a new College of All Saints, the church replaced an earlier one on the site dedicated to St Mary. Courtenay died in 1396 and the church and college were completed by his successor, Thomas Arundel, between 1396 and 1398. Richard II endowed the college with land and income from the Hospital of St Peter and St Paul in Maidstone and from the parishes of Linton, Farleigh, Sutton and Crundale. The college was also granted the advowsons for the parishes. To cover the cost of building the college, Courtenay obtained a bull to levy a charge of fourpence in the pound on all ecclesiastical revenue raised in his archbishopric.

When the college was closed in 1546 following the passing of the Chantries Act, its annual income was valued at £208 6s 2d. The church and the college were separated. The church became the parish church for the whole of Maidstone and the college's estate was granted to George Brooke, Baron Cobham but was forfeited to the crown in 1603 when his grandson, Henry Brooke, the 11th Baron Cobham, was charged with high treason for his part in the Main Plot against James I. In the reign of Charles I the college became the property of Sir Edward Henden and later passed into the family of the Earls of Romney.

The building

The church sits in a small churchyard with the River Medway to the west, the remnants of the college, including its gateway, to the south, the Archbishop's Palace to the north-west and the palace's tithe barn to the north-east. The medieval wall on the north and west sides of the churchyard and the Monckton War Memorial in the churchyard are both separately listed as Grade II structures.

The church is built of rag-stone in the Perpendicular style with buttressed walls and a crenellated parapet. It formerly had a spire, which was destroyed by a lightning strike in 1730. It has a nave six bays long with aisles on the north and south sides with a clerestory running the length of the church. On the south side is a chapel originally for the use of the Fraternity of Corpus Christi, a local lay community. The Credence and four-seated Sedilla incorporate a monument to the first master of the college, John Wotton (died 1417). Further monuments exist to Archbishop Courtenay, Lawrence Washington (died 1619), John Davy (died 1631) and a combined memorial to John Astley (died c. 1595), his son Sir John Astley (died 1639) and their wives. Burials in the church include the Astleys, Washington and the three Barons Astley of Reading. In the churchyard is the tomb of William Shipley, founder of the Royal Society of Arts.

The font is early 17th century and the choir stalls feature medieval misericords. The timber roof was replaced in 1886 to designs by John Loughborough Pearson. Pearson also designed screens and the reredos. The bells are regularly rung by the church's bell ringing society. The church clock was manufactured in 1899 by Gillett & Johnston and refurbished in 2007. It strikes the quarters and hours using Westminster chimes.

The building is on the Historic England Heritage at Risk Register.

Choirs

The church has male and female choirs directed by the Director of Liturgical Music.

The organist and Director of Liturgical Music is Philip Horley and the organist is Lionel Marchant.

See also
Grade I listed buildings in Maidstone
List of ecclesiastical restorations and alterations by J. L. Pearson

Notes and references

Notes

References

External links

Corpus Vitrearum Medii Aevi, Maidstone: All Saints Image of the medieval stained-glass window in Vestry.

14th-century church buildings in England
All Saints Church
Grade I listed churches in Kent
Church of England church buildings in Kent
Diocese of Canterbury
J. L. Pearson buildings
Churches completed in 1398